Burning Memories may refer to:

 Burning Memories (Kitty Wells album), 1985
 Burning Memories (Ray Price album), 1965
 "Burning Memories", a song by Machine Gun Kelly, from the album Hotel Diablo
 "It's Just a Burning Memory", a 2016 song by the Caretaker